Goodenia delicata is a species of flowering plant in the family Goodeniaceae and is endemic to eastern Australia. It is a low-lying to ascending herb with linear to narrow elliptic leaves mostly at the base of the plant, and racemes of yellow flowers.

Description

Taxonomy and naming
Goodenia delicata was first formally described in 1990 by Roger Charles Carolin in the journal Telopea from material collected in 1959 by Leslie Pedley near  Westmar in Queensland.

Distribution and habitat
This goodenia grows in forest and woodland on the tablelands of south-eastern Queensland and northern New South Wales.

References

delicata
Flora of Queensland
Flora of New South Wales
Plants described in 1990
Taxa named by Roger Charles Carolin